The Roman Catholic Diocese of Tula (erected 27 February 1961) is a suffragan diocese of the Archdiocese of Tulancingo. It was a suffragan of the Archdiocese of México until 25 November 2006.

Bishops

Ordinaries
José de Jesús Sahagún de la Parra (1961 - 1985), appointed Bishop of Ciudad Lázaro Cárdenas, Michoacán
José Trinidad Medel Pérez (1986 - 1993), appointed Archbishop of Durango
Octavio Villegas Aguilar (1994 - 2005), appointed Auxiliary Bishop of Morelia, Michoacán
Juan Pedro Juárez Meléndez (2006 - )

Other priest of this diocese who became bishop
José Antonio Fernández Hurtado, appointed Bishop of Tuxtepec, Oaxaca in 2005

Episcopal See
Tula, Hidalgo

External links and references

Tula
Christian organizations established in 1961
Roman Catholic dioceses and prelatures established in the 20th century
Hidalgo (state)
Tula, Roman Catholic Diocese of
1961 establishments in Mexico